The Taça da Liga, known outside Portugal as Portuguese League Cup, is an annual club football competition organised by the Liga Portuguesa de Futebol Profissional (LPFP) for teams competing in the top two tiers of Portuguese football – the Primeira Liga and Liga Portugal 2. Unlike Portugal's other domestic cup competition, the Taça de Portugal, the winners of the Taça da Liga do not qualify for European competitions.

The Taça da Liga was established in the 2007–08 season, thus becoming the third official competition for professional clubs in Portugal, after a proposal by Sporting and Boavista was approved by LPFP members on 28 November 2006. For sponsorship reasons, it is currently known as Allianz Cup (with the English word cup).

Benfica are the most successful team in the competition, having won seven trophies (four of which consecutively between 2008 and 2012). The current holders are Porto, who defeated Sporting CP in the 2023 final to secure their first title.

Format
The Taça da Liga format has suffered changes throughout the competition's history in order to increase the number of matches and also revenue for both clubs and LPFP. Starting in the 2021–22 season, the format is the following:

 First round – One-legged ties between all Segunda Liga teams (except reserve or B teams), the ten Primeira Liga teams ranked 7th–16th in the previous season, and the two teams promoted from the Segunda Liga, with the winner advancing to the next round.   
 Second round –  One-legged ties between the first-round winners and the two Primeira Liga teams ranked 5th and 6th in the previous season. The winners advance to the next round.
 Third round –  Four groups of three teams played in a single round-robin format, each containing two second-round winners and one of the four top-placed Primeira Liga season teams of the previous season. The group winners advance to the next round.
 Knockout phase – Semi-finals and final played as one-legged fixtures played in a neutral ground.

For 2022–23, due to fixture congestion surrounding the 2022 FIFA World Cup, all Segunda Liga and Primeira Liga teams (except reserve or B teams) were placed into 8 groups (6 groups of 4 teams and 2 groups of 5 teams), with the group winners advancing to the knockout phase, consisting of quarter-finals, semi-finals and the final. All knockout stage games are one-legged fixtures, with the semi-finals and finals still played in a neutral ground. All group stage games and the quarter-finals were played during the international break surrounding the World Cup.

Finals

Performance by club

Participating clubs

Players statistics

Appearances

Bold = Still active and playing in Portugal

Goalscorers

All-time top scorers

Bold = Still active and playing in Portugal

Goalscorers by seasons

Sponsorship
Since its inception (except in the period between 2011–15) the Taça da Liga has had the following naming sponsors meaning it has been known by different names:

Records

Most tournament wins (team): 7 wins, Benfica
Most final appearances (team): 8, Benfica
Most tournament wins (individual): 7, Luisão for Benfica; Rúben Amorim for Benfica (5) as a player, and for Braga (1) and Sporting CP (2) as a manager
Most final appearances: (individual): 6, Luisão for Benfica (2009–11, 2014–16)
Most matches (team): 62, Benfica
Most matches (individual): 43, Jardel
Most game wins (team): 40, Benfica
Most goals (team): 123, Benfica
Highest goalscorer (career): 12 goals, Tozé Marreco & Paulinho
Highest goalscorer (season): 5 goals, by Matheus for Vitória de Setúbal (2007–08), Hugo Vieira for Gil Vicente (2010–11) and Jonas for Benfica (2014–15)
Most goals scored in a match (individual): 4 goals, by Rabiola for Desportivo das Aves vs Trofense, 29 July 2012
Biggest win: Sporting CP 6–0 União da Madeira, third round, 20 December 2017
Biggest win in a final: Marítimo 2–6 Benfica, 20 May 2016
Highest scoring game: 8 goals, Belenenses 5–3 Leixões, first round, 7 August 2011 and Marítimo 2–6 Benfica, final, 20 May 2016
Most penalties in a deciding penalty shoot-out: 20 – Vitória de Guimarães 6–7 Sporting CP (27 September 2007)
Youngest goalscorer in the final: Bruno Pereirinha, 20 years and 19 days, for Sporting CP vs Benfica, 2009
Youngest player in the final: Nuno Mendes, 18 years, 7 months and 5 days for Sporting CP vs Braga, 2021
Youngest captain in the final: João Moutinho, 21 years, 6 months and 14 days for Sporting CP vs Vitória de Setúbal, 2008

See also
 Taça de Portugal
 Taça Ribeiro dos Reis (unofficial predecessor organized by the Portuguese Football Federation)
 Taça Federação Portuguesa de Futebol (another predecessor organized by the Portuguese Football Federation)
 List of association football competitions in Portugal
 List of Taça da Liga winning managers

References

External links

  
 Portugal – List of League Cup Finals, RSSSF.com

 
2
National association football league cups
Recurring sporting events established in 2007
2007 establishments in Portugal